Acta Apostolicae Sedis (Latin for "Acts of the Apostolic See"), often cited as AAS, is the official gazette of the Holy See, appearing about twelve times a year. It was established by Pope Pius X on 29 September 1908 with the decree Promulgandi Pontificias Constitutiones, and publication began in January 1909. It contains all the principal decrees, encyclical letters, decisions of Roman congregations, and notices of ecclesiastical appointments. The laws contained in it are to be considered promulgated when published, and effective three months from date of issue, unless a shorter or longer time is specified in the law.

Acta Sanctæ Sedis
Acta Sanctæ Sedis (Latin for "Acts of the Holy See") was a Roman monthly publication containing the principal public documents issued by the pope, directly or through the Roman Congregations.

It was begun in 1865, under the title of Acta Sanctæ Sedis in compendium redacta etc.. Though not designated as the official means of promulgating laws of the Holy See, it was on 23 May 1904 declared an organ of the Holy See to the extent that all documents printed in it were considered "authentic and official". The Acta Sanctæ Sedis ceased publication four years later.

Acta Apostolicae Sedis 

On 29 September 1908, Pope Pius X, in the decree Promulgandi Pontificias Constitutiones, replaced the Acta Sanctæ Sedis with the Acta Apostolicae Sedis, to which he gave the status of the official gazette of the Holy See, and which began publication in January 1909.

Acta Apostolicae Sedis is published in Latin and incorporates documents in many different languages.

Since 1929, Acta Apostolicae Sedis carries a supplement in Italian, called Supplemento per le leggi e disposizioni dello Stato della Città del Vaticano, containing laws and regulations of Vatican City, the city-state founded in that year. In accordance with paragraph 2 of the Legge sulle fonti del diritto of 7 June 1929, the laws of the state are promulgated by being included in this supplement.

See also
Index of Vatican City-related articles

References

Bibliography
Beal, John P., James A. Coriden, Thomas J. Green. New Commentary on the Code of Canon Law: Commissioned by the Canon Law Society of America (New York: Paulist Press, 2000).

External links
  Acta Apostolicae Sedis
 Acta Sanctae Sedis

Catholic canonical documents
Documents of the Catholic Church
Government gazettes
Government of Vatican City
Holy See
Latin-language newspapers
Latin words and phrases
Newspapers published in Vatican City
1908 establishments in Vatican City
Newspapers established in 1908